ZHLS-GF (Zone-Based Hierarchical Link State Routing Protocol with Gateway Flooding) is a hybrid routing protocol for computer networks that is based on ZHLS. 

In ZHLS, all network nodes construct two routing tables — an intra-zone routing table and an inter-zone routing table — by flooding NodeLSPs within the zone and ZoneLSPs throughout the network. However, this incurs a large communication overhead in the network. 

In ZHLS-GF, the flooding scheme floods ZoneLSPs only to the gateway nodes of zones, thus reducing the communication overhead significantly. Further, in ZHLS-GF only the gateway nodes store ZoneLSPs and constructs inter-zone routing tables, meaning that the total storage capacity required in the network is less than in ZHLS.

References

Hamma, T., Katoh, T., Bista, B.B. and Takata, T., 2006, “An Efficient ZHLS Routing Protocol for Mobile Ad Hoc Networks”, Proc. of DEXA Workshops 2006, pp. 66–70.

Ad hoc routing protocols
Wireless networking